Ginjer Buchanan (born in Pittsburgh, December 12, 1944) was Editor-in-Chief at Ace Books and Roc Books, the two science-fiction and fantasy imprints of Penguin Group (USA).

Background

Buchanan worked at Ace since 1984, was nominated for both the Hugo Award and the World Fantasy Award, and won a Hugo Award in 2014 for her editing. She was a Guest of Honor at OryCon in 2008, Foolscap in 2000, and ArmadilloCon in 1988, and was Toastmaster at the World Fantasy Convention in 1989. Buchanan retired in March 2014, after 30 years with Ace.

She is also occasionally a fiction writer.  Her published work includes three short stories in the anthologies Alternate Kennedys (her story "The End of the Summer by the Great Sea" was included in the anthology), Whatdunnits II, and By Any Other Fame, all edited by Mike Resnick, and also the novel White Silence (1999), a Highlander tie-in.  Prior to her career in publishing, she was an active member of science fiction fandom, and worked as a social worker.

References

External links

Interview at SlayerLit (with Amber Benson)
Interview for Penguin USA

1944 births
Living people
Science fiction editors
20th-century American novelists
American science fiction writers
American women short story writers
American women novelists
American speculative fiction editors
Women science fiction and fantasy writers
20th-century American women writers
Hugo Award-winning editors
20th-century American short story writers
Women speculative fiction editors